Abel Moreno Zorrero (born 19 February 1995) is a Spanish footballer who plays for CD Gerena as a left back.

Club career
Born in Almensilla, Seville, Andalusia, Moreno finished his formation with Sevilla FC, and made his debuts as a senior with the C-team in the 2014–15 campaign, in Tercera División. On 7 July 2015 he moved to neighbouring Córdoba CF, being assigned to the reserves also in the fourth tier.

On 9 September 2015 Moreno made his professional debut, starting in a 0–1 home loss against CD Lugo, for the season's Copa del Rey. He made his Segunda División debut on 29 November, playing the full 90 minutes in a 2–1 home win against Real Oviedo.

On 13 July 2016, Moreno was loaned to SD Ponferradina in Segunda División B. Roughly one year later he signed for another reserve team, Deportivo Aragón also in the third division.

References

External links

1995 births
Living people
People from Seville (comarca)
Sportspeople from the Province of Seville
Spanish footballers
Footballers from Andalusia
Association football defenders
Segunda División players
Segunda División B players
Tercera División players
Sevilla FC C players
Córdoba CF B players
Córdoba CF players
SD Ponferradina players
Real Zaragoza B players
Real Balompédica Linense footballers
CD Ebro players
CP Villarrobledo players
CD Gerena players